Adam Fisher is an American baseball executive.

Early life
Fisher grew up in Lexington, Massachusetts.  He attended Lexington High School, where he starred in baseball and organized and participated in charity sports events.  He studied American history at Harvard University, where he wrote a senior thesis on Jackie Robinson, graduating in 2001.

Career
Prior to working with the Atlanta Braves as assistant general manager, Fisher worked for the New York Mets as Senior Director of Baseball Operations.  He is known for having expertise in both classical scouting and sabermetrics.  In 2013, Fisher and other young baseball executives with Ivy League backgrounds were profiled by Newsday.  In 2015, he was included in an ESPN.com story about promising baseball executives.

Fisher has been credited, among others, with uncovering statistics that led to the Mets' interest in Daniel Murphy.

References

Year of birth missing (living people)
Living people
Harvard College alumni
People from Lexington, Massachusetts
Sportspeople from Middlesex County, Massachusetts
Lexington High School alumni
New York Mets personnel
Atlanta Braves personnel